Varavi (also Romanized as Varāvī, Vorāvī, Waravi, and Warāwi) is a city and capital of Varavi District, in Mohr County, Fars Province, Iran.  At the 2006 census, its population was 4,056, in 847 families.

References

Populated places in Mohr County

Cities in Fars Province